State Route 33 (SR 33) is a primary and secondary route in East Tennessee. It runs 176 miles, from the Georgia state line in Polk County, northeast to the Virginia state line north of Kyles Ford in Hancock County.  South of Maryville, SR 33 is a "hidden" route which shares a concurrency with US 411.

The section of SR 33 between Knoxville and Tazewell, along with US 25E between Tazewell and Middlesboro, Kentucky, was an inspiration for the song The Ballad of Thunder Road.  In the song, a moonshiner runs illegal whiskey from Kentucky to Knoxville on this route.  Sections of the former Highway 33 in Union County have signs marking "The Original Thunder Road".

Route description

Polk County

SR 33 begins in Polk County in Tennga at the Georgia state line concurrent with US 411 as its unsigned companion route. It begins as a primary highway. US 411/SR 33 go north and pass by the community of Conasauga and cross over the Conasauga River to enter Old Fort where they intersect SR 313. They continue north to Ocoee where they have an interchange with US 64/US 74/SR 40. US 411/SR 33 then continue north, then turn northwest and cross the Ocoee River before entering Benton. In Benton, they have an intersection with SR 314. They then leave Benton and continue north. They then enter Delano and begin a concurrency with SR 30. They then cross the Hiwassee River to pass by Hiwassee/Ocoee Scenic River State Park (via Spring Creek Road) and intersect with the eastern end of SR 163 before leaving Delano. US 411/SR 33/SR 30 continues north and crosses into McMinn County.

McMinn County

A short distance later, they enter Etowah. In Etowah, they intersect with the western end of SR 310, before SR 30 separates and turns west towards Athens. US 411/SR 33 then leave Etowah and go north to Englewood, where they intersect and have a short concurrency with SR 39. They then continue north to cross into Monroe County.

Monroe County

They then enter Madisonville and have an interchange with SR 68. They then bypass downtown to the north and then leave Madisonville, going northeast. US 411/SR 33 then intersect and become concurrent with SR 72 before entering Vonore. In Vonore, they intersect SR 360 before crossing Tellico Lake/Little Tennessee River, leaving Vonore. Just before crossing into Loudon County, SR 72 separates and turns east, running along the banks of Tellico Lake. US 411/SR 33 then cross into Loudon County and go northeast to Greenback to intersect with the southern end of SR 95. They then cross into Blount County.

Blount County

They continue north to intersect the southern end of SR 336 just north of Lanier. They then intersect and become concurrent with US 129/SR 115 before entering Maryville. They then intersect with the southern end of SR 335 before entering downtown. Just before downtown, US 129/SR 115 separate at an interchange, with US 129/SR 115 bypassing downtown to the west and providing access to McGhee Tyson Airport. US 411/SR 33 then go through downtown, where they intersect US 321/SR 73 before coming to an intersection with SR 35. Here, SR 33 separates and follows its own path with US 411 turning south on SR 35. Also, SR 33 becomes signed for the first time and turns into a secondary highway. It again has another intersection with SR 335, this time the northern end, before leaving Maryville to intersect the current eastern end of I-140 (Pellissippi Parkway, Exit 14) in Eagleton Village. SR 33 goes north through Rockford before crossing into Knox County.

Knox County

Shortly after crossing the line, it has an interchange with SR 168. It then enters Knoxville in the South Knoxville neighborhood. SR 33 then merges and becomes concurrent with US 441. US 441/SR 33 then cross into downtown via the Henley Street Bridge over the Tennessee River. In downtown, they become concurrent with US 11/US 70/SR 1/SR 71. They then have an interchange with I-40 and I-275. They then have an intersection with SR 62 not even a half block later. US 11/US 70/SR 1 then separate and go east, leaving US 441/SR 33 to go north, with SR 33 changing to a primary highway at this intersection. They continue through some North Knoxville neighborhoods, where they have an interchange with Hall of Fame Drive and unsigned SR 71 joins the concurrency, before entering Fountain City. In Fountain City, they intersect with the southern end of SR 331 just before an interchange with I-640/US 25W/SR 9. It continues through downtown Fountain City before leaving Fountain City and Knoxville all together. They then enter Halls Crossroads and US 441/SR 71 separate and go west, just before an intersection with SR 131. SR 33 then continues alone and leaves Halls Crossroads, traveling through rural unincorporated Knox County before crossing into Union County.

Union County

In Union County, it passes by the Knoxville Dragstrip before having an intersection and concurrency with SR 61 in Paulette. They then have a short concurrency with SR 144 before entering Maynardville. They go through downtown before SR 61 separates and goes east, then SR 33 goes north and leaves Maynardville. It then meets the eastern end of SR 170 in Hickory Valley before crossing Norris Lake and into Claiborne County.

Claiborne County

SR 33 then goes by a marina before going north to New Tazewell. It goes through New Tazewell before entering Tazewell. It goes through downtown to have an intersection and begin a concurrency with US 25E/SR 32. They leave Tazewell and go south through Springdale, before separating from US 25E/SR 32 and going north east, just before another crossing of Norris Lake. SR 33 then becomes curvy before crossing into Hancock County.

Hancock County

Still curvy, it goes through rural unincorporated Hancock county and begins paralleling the Clinch River before entering Sneedville at an intersection with the northern ends of SR 31 and SR 66. It then turns north and enters downtown and intersecting the eastern end of SR 63. It then turns northeast again and leaves Sneedville. It goes northeast, still curvy, and parallels the Clinch River again all the way to Kyles Ford, where it has an intersection and short concurrency with SR 70. It then becomes a secondary highway and leaves the Clinch River to go north to the Virginia State Line, where it continues as SR 696, a short connector to SR 600.

Major intersections

References

033
Transportation in Polk County, Tennessee
Transportation in McMinn County, Tennessee
Transportation in Monroe County, Tennessee
Transportation in Loudon County, Tennessee
Transportation in Blount County, Tennessee
Transportation in Knox County, Tennessee
Transportation in Knoxville, Tennessee
Transportation in Union County, Tennessee
Transportation in Claiborne County, Tennessee
Transportation in Hancock County, Tennessee